William Fiske may refer to:

Bill Fiske, Baron Fiske (William Geoffrey Fiske, 1905–1975), British politician
William Fiske (1954–2008), co-creator of Quarry Hill Creative Center
Billy Fiske (William Meade Lindsley Fiske III, 1911–1940), American Olympian and fighter pilot
William Fiske (footballer) (1885–1918), English football goalkeeper

See also
William Fisk (disambiguation)